Gan Peck Cheng (born 21 November 1966) is a Malaysian politician who has served as Member of the Johor State Legislative Assembly (MLA) for Penggaram since May 2013. She served as Deputy Speaker of the Johor State Legislative Assembly from June 2018 to January 2022 and State Leader of the Opposition of Johor from October 2015 to the collapse of the Barisan Nasional (BN) state administration in May 2018. She is a member of the Democratic Action Party (DAP), a component party of the Pakatan Harapan (PH) opposition coalition.

Personal life
She was born in Kampung Minyak Beku, Batu Pahat, Johor. She got her secondary education in Chinese High School Batu Pahat.

Earlier career
Before she served as a state assemblywoman, she have been working as a kindergarten teacher.

Political career 
Gan contested for the Pontian federal seat and Penggaram state seat in the 1990 general and Johor state elections and again only for the Penggaram state seat in the 1995, 1999, 2004 and 2008 Johor state elections which she suffered from electoral defeats. In the 2013 general election, she finally broke her streak of five electoral defeats and ended her 23-year wait to be elected as an MLA. She gained her long-awaited victory in the same seat of Penggaram by defeating her opponents King Ban Siang from Malaysian Chinese Association (MCA) of Barisan Nasional (BN) with 10,051 majority votes.

In 2014, Gan came out tops in the Johor DAP state committee polls, receiving 271 votes. Gan, a former DAP state secretary, was appointed as the new State Leader of the Opposition of Johor on 27 October 2015 to replace Boo Cheng Hau who had resigned.

In the 2018 Johor state election, she retained her Penggaram state seat for her second term with higher majority of votes and was then appointed to be the first ever female Deputy Speaker of the Johor State Legislative Assembly in the history after PH took over the Johor state administration led by Menteri Besar Osman Sapian. In February 2020, the PH state administration was overthrown and replaced with the new BN state administration led by new Menteri Besar Hasni Mohammad and PH returned to the state opposition after only 22 months in power. However, given by her identity as an opposition MLA, she was not removed from the deputy speakership and retained by the new administration along with Speaker Suhaizan Kayat who is also from the opposition. This became one of a very rare cases which the speakers are from the opposition instead of the government in Malaysia.

In the 2022 Johor state election, she retained her Penggaram state seat and was reelected for her third term by defeating all of her opponents but with a significantly lessened majority of only 9,952 votes compared to her last victory in 2018. After BN returned to the state government after its victory, she and Suhaizan were not reappointed as the speaker and deputy speaker of the assembly.

Election results

External links

References 

Living people
1966 births
People from Batu Pahat
People from Johor
Malaysian schoolteachers
Malaysian politicians of Chinese descent
Democratic Action Party (Malaysia) politicians
Women MLAs in Johor
Members of the Johor State Legislative Assembly
Leaders of the Opposition in the Johor State Legislative Assembly
21st-century Malaysian women politicians
21st-century Malaysian politicians